Bubble and Squeak is an EP by Tom Jenkinson, better known as the artist Squarepusher. The EP was released on 12" vinyl format only.  The name is a reference to an English dish.

Track listing
Side A
"Bubble" - 6:15
Side B
"Squeak" - 7:27

References

External links
Discogs

1996 albums
Squarepusher albums